Epidesma klagesi is a moth of the subfamily Arctiinae. It was described by Walter Rothschild in 1912. It is found in Venezuela.

References

Epidesma
Moths described in 1912